Myriam Flühmann (born 9 June 1986 in Zürich, Switzerland) is a Swiss figure skater. She is the 2004 Swiss national bronze medalist. She won the bronze medal at the 2003 Triglav Trophy.

External links
 

Swiss female single skaters
Figure skaters from Zürich
1986 births
Living people